Thalassery railway station (Code:TLY) is a railway station serving the City of Thalassery in Kerala. It lies in the Shoranur–Mangalore section of the Southern Railways. It is the third largest station in Kerala in terms of number of passengers under Palakkad division. The station has two platforms and three tracks. Though no trains originate from this station, trains halting at the station connect the city to prominent cities in India such as Thiruvananthapuram, Kochi, Chennai, Mumbai, Bangalore, Kozhikode, Coimbatore, Quilon, New Delhi, Mangalore, Pune, Jaipur, Jammu Tawi, Okha and so forth.

The old platform ticket counter is closed after the renovation of Thalassery railway station. The new ticket counter is located at Platform No. 02. The road which connects Thalassery railway station is known as Goodshed Road which is now often referred as new railway station road.
Thalassery railway station once had goods transportation facility. which is now discontinued and moved to Edakkad railway station.

No direct line connects Thalassery to Mysore, although a feasibility study for such a route was funded in 2013.

TLY railway station is a Class 'A' railway station. Almost all major trains connecting the other parts of Kerala, Tamil Nadu, Andhra Pradesh and North India halt here.

Thalassery (Station Code: TLY) and Jagannath Temple Gate (Station Code: JGE) are two different stations which serve Tellicherry city.

Infrastructure 
Thalassery railway station has two platforms, namely Platform No.1 and 2 with two entrances. There are two ticket counters. The railway station has lift as well as escalator facilities to cross platform. The station is also equipped with free wireless internet access facility, and prepaid auto stand.

Location 
Thalassery Railway station is located just 700 m from Thalassery New Bus Stand in Narangapuram.   

Kannur International Airport is just 24 km from the railway station which will be the airport station.

Important trains 

 Jan Shatabdi Express
 Mangala Lakshadweep Superfast Express
 Netravati Express
 Parasuram Express
 Ernakulam Intercity Express
 Coimbatore Intercity Superfast Express
 Ernad Express
 Malabar Express
 Maveli Express
 Navyug Express
 Vivek Express
 Poorna Express
 Chennai Superfast Mail
 West Coast Superfast Express
 Chennai Superfast Express
 Alleppey Executive Express
 Mangalore–Trivandrum Express
 Yeswantpur Express via Salem
 Mangalore–Kacheguda Express
 Okha–Ernakulam Express
 Gandhidam–Nagercoil Express
 Veraval–Trivandrum Express
 Bhavnagar–Kochuveli Express
 LTT–Kochuveli Superfast Express

See also 

 Thalassery
 Malabar Coast
 North Malabar
 Jaganath Temple Gate railway station
 Dharmadam railway station
 Palakkad railway division

References

External links

Railway stations in Kannur district
Palakkad railway division
Buildings and structures in Thalassery